Amigas y rivales (English: Friends and Rivals) is a Mexican juvenile telenovela produced by Emilio Larrosa for Televisa in 2001. On Monday, February 26, 2001, Canal de las Estrellas started broadcasting Amigas y rivales weekdays at 7:00pm, replacing Primer amor, a mil por hora. The last episode was broadcast on Friday, November 9, 2001 with El juego de la vida replacing it the following Monday.

It stars Michelle Vieth, Arath de la Torre, Ludwika Paleta, Rodrigo Vidal, Angélica Vale, Johnny Lozada, Adamari López, Gabriel Soto, Joana Benedek and Eric del Castillo.

Plot 
Amigas y Rivales tells the story of four women from different social backgrounds. The first is Laura, a studious, sensitive, serious girl from a middle-class family; she studies data processing in a private university because she received a scholarship.

Jimena is the typical rich girl, dissipated and irresponsible, for whom sex is just another amusement. At one point she is kidnapped although she doesn't realize it. She lives with Sebastián, a drug dealer who gives her drugs in exchange for her having sex with men in his home. Ofelia is Jimena's best friend. Like Jimena, she is rich and lives for pleasure and fun, until she gets infected with HIV.

The fourth protagonist is Nayeli, who has a humble background and works as a maid in Jimena's home. Nayeli dreams of being a Hollywood actress, like her idol, Salma Hayek. This dream takes her to the United States illegally, where she meets boxer Johnny Trinidad, who falls in love with her. She is reported to the immigration service and deported back to Mexico.

Laura's emotions are divided between Robertito and his father, Don Roberto de la O, who hired Laura to instruct his firm in how to use their new computers. Don Roberto becomes determined to attract Laura, who unconsciously compares him with her own father, a man of weak character. Laura and Don Roberto date briefly; their relationship ends when Laura's mother lies to Don Roberto, telling him she's his daughter. Later Laura discovers that he is not her biological father, and that she was the result of a one-night stand. Her parents separate. She resumes dating Don Roberto until she realizes, weeks later, that she isn't in love with him after all. She is caught kissing his son Robertito. When Don Roberto discovers, thanks to Roxana's deceitful efforts to keep him, that Laura loves Robertito, he suffers a stroke.

Roxana, Don Roberto's second wife, is extremely beautiful but hiding an unscrupulous criminal soul under the mask of an ideal wife. Her real name is Carolina. She attempted to kill her own father, Tomás, for which he sent her to an asylum, but she escaped and established the new identity of Roxana. She poisoned Don Roberto's first wife so he'd be free to marry her, but secretly desired her new stepson Robertito and killed his fiancée so she would have a chance with him. They became romantically involved, but Robertito realizes how much he loves Laura and tries to end his relationship with Roxana, which angers her. Roxana teams up with Sebastián to take revenge on the friends. She goes to jail but manages to escape.

Georgina sleeps with Sebastián and gets pregnant but she later shoots and kills him. After having been unwilling to live, Ofelia chooses to fight for her life. Roberto proposes to Laura. Jimena sheds her bad habits, and Nayeli manages to carry on a successful acting career.

At the friends' graduation party, Roxana appears with a group of armed men planning to take revenge on Jimena and Laura. Laura is absent because she felt sick. Roxana mentions killing Roberto's first wife. Joaquin is accidentally killed.

Pepe is shot in the arm. Carlota reveals that Robertito and Roxana are half-siblings, as Padre Tomás is the father of both of them. Roxana wants to throw sulfuric acid on Jimena's face but Nayeli, Ofelia and Tamara hold her and Nayeli manages to make Roxana pour the acid on her own face. The police arrive and detain Roxana, and she ends in an asylum with a disfigured face.

Jimena chose Pepe because Carlos failed her when he chose Ángela over her and will not forgive him. He wishes her happiness with Pepe. Paula gives up Ernesto so he can be happy with Nayeli. Nayeli ends up with Ernesto. Tamara ends up alone because of her bad luck with men.

Ofelia and Ulises reunite the whole group Jimena, Nayeli, Tamara, Georgina, Robertito, Johnny, Ernesto, and Pepe at the end. Laura is absent because she is sick. Ulises announces that Ofelia has a life expectancy of at least 10 more years. They celebrate life and friendship together after so much pain and suffering.

Cast 

 Michelle Vieth as Laura González Uribe
 Arath de la Torre as Roberto "Robertito" de la O Terán
 Ludwika Paleta as Jimena de la O Terán
 Rodrigo Vidal as Armando del Valle
 Angélica Vale as Wendy Nayeli Pérez
 Johnny Lozada as Johnny Trinidad
 Adamari López as Ofelia Villada Ruvalcaba
 Gabriel Soto as Ulises Barrientos "El Feo"
 Joana Benedek as Roxana Brito de la O / Carolina Vallejo
 Eric del Castillo as Don Roberto de la O
 Alejandro Ávila as Sebastián Morales
 Manuela Ímaz as Tamara de la Colina
 Rafael Inclán as Ramón "Moncho" / Jacaránda / Manuel de la Colina
 Susana González as Ángela Riveira
 Chela Castro as Carlota Olmedo
 Eugenio Cobo as Pedro González
 Alicia Fahr as Alma Uribe de González
 Marisol Mijares as Andrea González Uribe
 Mayrín Villanueva as Georgina Sánchez
 René Strickler as Carlos Torreblanca
 Eduardo Santamarina as José "Pepe" Alcántara
 Ernesto Laguardia as himself
 Nailea Norvind as Paula Morell
 Felicia Mercado as Sonia Villalobos Vda. de Torreblanca
 Imperio Vargas as Yolanda
 Zoila Quiñones as Adelaida
 Irina Areu as La Güera
 Marina Marín as Amada
 Luis Roberto Guzmán as Francisco "Frank"
 Carlos Miguel as Guillermo Morales "El Chacal"
 Sergio deFassio as Chema
 Sergio Acosta as Gardenia
 Ricardo Silva as Joaquin Dorantes
 Elías Chiprout as Luis Santoscoy
 Edgar Ponce as Ricardo
 Benjamín Rivero as Eduardo
 Rudy Casanova as Antonio "Tony"
 Ana Liz Rivera as Marilú
 Claudia Troyo as Mónica
 Salim Rubiales as Germán de la Colina
 Ramón Valdés Urtiz as Rodrigo
 Paulo César Quevedo as Edgar Romero
 Martha Julia as Margarita Reyes Retana
 Luis Couturier as Emilio Larrosa
 Damián Mendiola as Abelardo
 Alejandro de la Madrid as Rolando
 Silvia Suárez as Leonora
 Miguel Palmer as Alberto
 Arsenio Campos as Father Tomás Vallejo
 Rosángela Balbó as Magdalena de Morell
 Maki as Alejandra del Valle
 Arturo Farfán as "El Momo"
 Patricia Ramírez as Natalia Solís
 Shirley as Julieta
 Maricruz Nájera as Camelia
 Alejandra Gollas as Jessica
 Christina Pastor as Irene
 Claudio Sorel as Lorenzo Riveira
 Juan Romanca as Pascual
 Mariana Rivera as Juanita
 Abril Campillo as Susana
 Rodrigo Ruiz as Father Emiliano
 Krystian Mohzo Díaz as "El Mosh"
 Elizabeth Álvarez as Rocío del Toro
 Bibelot Mansur as Stephany
 Guillermo Capetillo as Esteban
 Kelchie Arizmendi as Gisela
 Joemy Blanco as Rebeca
 Jorge Veytía as Miguel
 Eduardo Cuervo as Óscar
 Vanessa Arias as Isabel
 Julio Becker as Javier
 Pablo Osuna as Octavio
 Lorena Velázquez as Itzel de la Colina
 Fabián Fuentes as Brian Pérez
 Karen Sandoval as Gemma Pérez
 Ángel Claude as Jonathan Pérez
 María Luisa Coronel as Johnny's mother
 Ana Hally as Josefina
 Joana Brito as Mother Superior
 Alejandro Calva as Jorge
 Enrique Hidalgo as Enrique "Quique" Montegarza
 Alondra Torres as Jennifer
 Itatí Cantoral as Eduviges
 Maribel Guardia as herself
 Sergio Sendel as himself
 Andrea Legarreta as herself
 Martha Carrillo as herself
 Salvador Garcini as himself
 José Ángel García as himself
 Amelia Zapata as "La Cara Cortada"
 Arturo Lorca as Julio
 Benjamín Islas as Comandante
 José Luis Reséndez as Juan
 Gustavo Negrete as Doctor
 Jorge Robles as "El Chino"
 Juan Ángel Esparza as Francisco
 Néstor Leoncio as Alfredo
 Marco Muñoz as Investigator
 Raúl Macías as Kid Dinamita
 Roberto "Flaco" Guzmán as Jimmy
 Roberto Tello as Silvio
 Rocío Yaber as Francisco's mother
 Sylvia Valdés as Martha
 Roger Cudney as Mr. Jones
 Rubén Morales as Ofelia's father
 Tania Prado as Lorena
 Alexandra Graña as Daniela
 Jan as Julio

Soundtrack

Awards and nominations

References

External links
  at esmas.com 
 

2001 telenovelas
Mexican telenovelas
2001 Mexican television series debuts
2001 Mexican television series endings
Spanish-language telenovelas
Television shows set in Mexico City
Televisa telenovelas
Teen telenovelas